Henry George Purver (3 May 1891 – 31 July 1916) was an English professional footballer who played as a centre forward in the Southern Football League for Brentford.

Personal life
As of 1911, Purver worked as a newspaper reader, and by the time of the First World War, he worked as a reporter for The Times. In July 1915, eleven months after the British entry into World War I, he enlisted in Hounslow as a private in the 24th Battalion of the Royal Fusiliers. Shortly after enlisting, Purver was gassed and underwent a lengthy period of convalescence, during which he married Margaret Clifford in October 1915. He returned to the frontline in April 1916 and was reported missing in action, presumed killed at Delville Wood on 31 July 1916. His body was never recovered and he is commemorated on the Thiepval Memorial.

See also
List of people who disappeared

Career statistics

References

1891 births
1916 deaths
Association football inside forwards
Brentford F.C. players
Brentford F.C. wartime guest players
British Army personnel of World War I
British military personnel killed in the Battle of the Somme
Footballers from Isleworth
English footballers
Southern Football League players
Oxford City F.C. players
English reporters and correspondents
The Times journalists
Royal Fusiliers soldiers
Missing in action of World War I
Missing person cases in France
Military personnel from London